Julia Bergshoeff (born 14 August 1997) is a Dutch model.  She was discovered in April 2013 by a booker from Ulla Models and is currently ranked on the "Top 50 Models Women" list by Models.com. During her first season, she was an exclusive for Prada and Miu Miu and made her runway debut at the Prada S/S 14 Resort Show in Milan.

Early life and career 
Bergshoeff was born in Papendrecht in the Netherlands. After being discovered while shopping with friends, Bergshoeff was signed to the Dutch modelling agency Ulla Models and appeared as an exclusive for Prada and Miu Miu.  She has also appeared on the runways of Alexander McQueen, Burberry Prorsum, Calvin Klein, Chanel, Celine, Coach, Dior, Dolce & Gabbana, Donna Karan, Fendi, Givenchy, Jason Wu, Jil Sander, Lanvin, Louis Vuitton, Marc Jacobs, Marni, Narcisco Rodriguez, Prabal Gurung, Proenza Schouler, Salvatore Ferragamo, Valentino, and Vera Wang, among others.

Her first campaign was for Prada S/S 14, followed by appearances in the Gucci Cruise 2015 and Proenza Schouler F/W 2014 campaigns. The following season Bergshoeff returned as the face of Proenza Schouler and appeared in campaigns for Coach, COS, DSquared2, Mango Denim, Adolfo Dominguez, and Salvatore Ferragamo in 2015.

Bergshoeff has appeared on the covers of Intermission Magazine (S/S 2015), NY Times Style Magazine (Summer 2015), Vogue Netherlands (April and June 2015), and Vogue Germany (September 2015).

She has been one of the faces of the Zara S/S 2016 campaign and was an exclusive Proenza Schouler exclusive in New York Fashion Week F/W 2016.

In 2014, Bergshoeff was chosen as a "Top Newcomer" by models.com.

References 

Dutch female models
People from Papendrecht
Living people
1997 births
Prada exclusive models